Conrad von Borsig (April 23, 1873, in Berlin – February 13, 1945, in Prillwitz) was a co-owner of the German mechanical engineering .

Biography 
Conrad von Borsig was the son of Albert Borsig and the grandson of August Borsig. His brothers were Ernst and Arnold. Borsig attended the Luisengymnasium in Berlin-Moabit. He then completed a commercial apprenticeship that included both banking and export business. In 1894 he became co-owner and commercial manager of the Borsig company. He was also a member of the Central Committee of the Reichsbank.

Literature 
 Munzinger: International Biographical Archive. 01/1948 of December 22, 1947.
 Hubertus Neuschäffer: Castles and mansions in Western Pomerania. Commission publisher Gerhard Rautenberg, Leer 1994, p. 184.
 Eckhard Hansen, Florian Tennstedt (Eds.) Volume 2: Social politicians in the Weimar Republic and during National Socialism 1919 to 1945. Kassel University Press, Kassel 2018, p. 16 f. ( Online, PDF; 3.9 MB).

References 

German businesspeople
1873 births
1945 deaths